Anolis pogus, the St. Martin anole or Anguilla Bank bush anole, is a species of anole lizard that is extant to the Caribbean island of Saint Martin, located in the Lesser Antilles. Its range used to include Anguilla, but it is now extirpated there. It may have occurred on Saint Barthélemy.

Males reach a maximum length of 58 mm snout-to-vent.  Males have a uniform light brown to orange-brown dorsal surface, with an off-white to yellowish ventral surface.  It has a turquoise area around its eye, which may extend to its upper head, and occasionally with an otherwise rust-brown head.  Females are duller in color, but are marked with a mid-dorsal stripe, and sometimes also a white flank stripe.

A. pogus coexists throughout much of its range with A. gingivinus, though they appear to fill different niches, for example by A. pogus preferring lower and less exposed perches.

Previously described as a subspecies of A. wattsi, it was elevated to species level in 1990.

References

.

External links
Anolis pogus at the Encyclopedia of Life

Anoles
Lizards of the Caribbean
Reptiles of Saint Martin (island)
Reptiles described in 1972